Viliami Fine (born 1 December 1997) is a Tongan rugby union player who plays for Otago in the National Provincial Championship. His playing position is wing.

Reference list

External links
itsrugby.co.uk profile

1997 births
Tongan rugby union players
Living people
Rugby union wings
Tonga international rugby union players
Otago rugby union players
Southland rugby union players